Kinga is a female name, a variant of Kunigunde. It may refer to:

People
 Kinga of Poland, Hungarian saint

Surname
 Sonam Kinga, Bhutanese actor
 Yukari Kinga, Japanese footballer

Given name
 Kinga Achruk, Polish handball player
 Kinga Augustyn, Polish violinist
 Kinga Baranowska, Polish mountaineer
 Kinga Bóta, Hungarian sprint canoer
 Kinga Choszcz, Polish travel writer
 Kinga Czuczor, Hungarian beauty pageant contestant
 Kinga Czigány, Hungarian sprint canoer
 Kinga Dékány, Hungarian sprint canoer
 Kinga Dunin, Polish writer
 Kinga Fabó, Hungarian poet
 Kinga Gajewska (born 1990), Polish politician
 Kinga Gál, Hungarian politician
 Kinga Göncz, Hungarian politician
 Kinga Grzyb, Polish handball player
 Kinga Janurik, Hungarian handballer
 Kinga Klivinyi, Hungarian handballer
 Kinga Maculewicz-De La Fuente, French volleyball player
 Kinga Philipps, Polish actress
 Kinga Preis, Polish actress
 Kinga Rusin, Polish TV presenter
 Kinga Tshering, Bhutanese politician
 Kinga Wojtasik, Polish beach volleyball player
 Kinga Zsigmond, Hungarian javelin thrower

Animals
 Eupithecia kinga, a moth in the family Geometridae

Other
 Kinga people, an ethnic and linguistic group from Njombe Region, Tanzania
 Kinga language, a Bantu language of Tanzania

Language and nationality disambiguation pages